The 2010 US Open was a tennis tournament played on outdoor hard courts, held from August 30 to September 13, 2010, in the USTA Billie Jean King National Tennis Center at Flushing Meadows, Queens, New York City, United States.

The tournament was initially going to finish with Men's Singles final on September 12, but was postponed due to rain on the last day and just before the men's tournament final. In the previous two years the tournament was also postponed because of weather.

Juan Martín del Potro and Kim Clijsters were the defending champions. Del Potro, due to a wrist injury, opted not to defend his title. Clijsters successfully defended her title with a score of 6–2, 6–1 in the final against Vera Zvonareva.

Notable stories

Milestones 
 Maria Sharapova recorded her 100th Grand Slam match victory with a 6–0, 6–0 defeat of wildcard Beatrice Capra in the third round.
 Kim Clijsters became the first woman since Venus Williams in 2000–1 to successfully defend her US Open title, by defeating Vera Zvonareva in the final. The final lasted just under one hour with Clijsters winning 6–2, 6–1.
 Rafael Nadal defeated Novak Djokovic 6–4, 5–7, 6–4, 6–2 in the men's final, and in doing so, completed his Golden Career Grand Slam.

Serena Williams' withdrawal 

Three-time champion and World No. 1 Serena Williams officially announced her withdrawal from the US Open on 20 August due to foot surgery. Her withdrawal also meant that she and older sister Venus could not pair up to defend the doubles title they won in 2009, and allowed WTA No. 2 Caroline Wozniacki to be installed as the top seed for the tournament, where she was defeated in the semi-finals by Vera Zvonareva. It was the first time since 2003 in which Serena Williams was forced to miss her national championships due to injury, the first Grand Slam tournament she missed through injury since Wimbledon in 2006, the first time since the 2007 Australian Open in which the women's World No. 1 missed a Grand Slam tournament and the first time in the WTA's 35-year rankings history that the World No. 1 missed the US Open.

Other notable withdrawals included two-time champion Justine Henin, as well as men's defending champion Juan Martín del Potro, Tommy Haas, Jo-Wilfried Tsonga, Ivo Karlović and Mario Ančić. Venus Williams, Maria Sharapova, Ana Ivanovic, Kim Clijsters and John Isner had all been in doubt after suffering minor injuries during lead-up tournaments but all were cleared to play.

Victoria Azarenka collapses 
In a second round match played in 40-degree heat, Belarusian 10th seed Victoria Azarenka collapsed whilst trailing Gisela Dulko 1–5 in the first set. Azarenka was subsequently taken to hospital in a wheelchair where she was diagnosed with mild concussion and later released a statement saying that a mishap in the gym, and not the heat, caused her to collapse during the match. Her second round retirement represented her worst ever performance at the US Open, having never previously fallen before the third round. It was also the second time she was forced to retire from a match at a Major, when she retired in near identical circumstances against Serena Williams at the 2009 Australian Open.

Spanish performance 
The men's tournament was well known for the excellent performances of Spanish players. Of the sixteen Spaniards that started in the 128-man draw, six of them reached the fourth round: Rafael Nadal, Fernando Verdasco, Tommy Robredo, David Ferrer, Feliciano López and Albert Montañés. There were two all-Spanish fourth round matches, guaranteeing two Spaniards in the quarter-finals: Nadal vs. López and Ferrer vs. Verdasco (the latter winning in a final set tiebreak). In a rematch of their 2009 Australian Open semi-final, Nadal defeated Verdasco in straight sets in the all-Spanish quarter-final, and went on to become the first Spaniard since Manuel Orantes in 1975 to win the US Open.

Singles players 
Men's singles

Women's singles

Player(s) of the day 
 Day 1:  Andy Roddick – Roddick advanced to the second round of the US Open with a 6–3, 6–2, 6–2 victory over  Stéphane Robert on his 28th birthday.
 Day 2:  Beatrice Capra – The young wild card entrant defeated  Karolina Šprem 6–1, 6–3 and advanced to the second round.
 Day 3:  Ryan Harrison – The 18-year-old qualifier ousted 15th-seeded  Ivan Ljubičić in a hard-fought match, 6–3, 6–7(4–7), 6–3, 6–4.
 Day 4:  Kei Nishikori – The qualifier, and only Japanese player in the men's draw, upset 11th-seeded  Marin Čilić in a grueling five-hour match, 5–7, 7–6(8–6), 3–6, 7–6(7–3), 6–1.
 Day 5:  Sergiy Stakhovsky – The Pilot Pen champion fought past a rain delay, a partisan crowd, and a determined young opponent to take down  Ryan Harrison, 6–3, 5–7, 3–6, 6–3, 7–6(8–6).
 Day 6:  Caroline Wozniacki – The Pilot Pen champion destroyed  Chan Yung-jan, 6–1, 6–0, maintaining her average of one game lost per match at the tournament as she heads into the Round of 16.
 Day 7:  Francesca Schiavone – The world #7 defeated  Anastasia Pavlyuchenkova, 6–3, 6–0 in just 1 hour and 8 minutes to advance into the Quarterfinals.
 Day 8:  Kaia Kanepi – Overcame a lopsided start to upset 15th-seeded  Yanina Wickmayer, 0–6, 7–6(7–2), 6–1, reaching her first US Open quarterfinals.
 Day 9:  Stan Wawrinka – Two days after his upset of  Andy Murray, the Swiss overcame crowd favorite and last American standing  Sam Querrey in a long five-setter, 7–6(11–9), 6–7(5–7), 7–5, 4–6, 6–4.
 Day 10:  Vera Zvonareva – Russia's top player defeated 31st-seeded  Kaia Kanepi, 6–3, 7–5, in gusty conditions for her best-ever US Open showing.
 Day 11:  Mikhail Youzhny – The big-hitting Russian outlasted  Stan Wawrinka in five sets, 3–6, 7–6(9–7), 3–6, 6–3, 6–3, to advance to the semifinals.
 Day 12:  Bob Bryan /  Mike Bryan – The American twins won their 9th Grand Slam title and 3rd US Open, defeating  Rohan Bopanna /  Aisam-ul-Haq Qureshi 7–6(7–5), 7–6(7–4).
 Day 13:  Novak Djokovic – The ATP ranked #3 defeated  Roger Federer in a five-set match to reach his first Grand Slam final since he won the 2008 Australian Open.
 Day 14: No matches completed due to rain.
 Day 15:  Rafael Nadal – The World #1 beat  Novak Djokovic to win the US Open for the first time and complete his Career Slam.

Day-by-day summaries

Events

Men's singles

 Rafael Nadal def.  Novak Djokovic, 6–4, 5–7, 6–4, 6–2
 It was Nadal's 6th title of the year and 42nd of his career. It was his 3rd slam of the year, first US Open, and 9th slam of his career.

Women's singles

 Kim Clijsters def.  Vera Zvonareva, 6–2, 6–1
• It was Clijsters' 4th title of the year and 39th of her career. It was her 3rd career Grand Slam singles title and her 3rd and last at the US Open.

Men's doubles

 Bob Bryan /  Mike Bryan def.  Rohan Bopanna /  Aisam-ul-Haq Qureshi, 7–6(7–5), 7–6(7–4).
 It was the Bryan's ninth grand slam men's doubles title for their careers, and the third US Open crown along with 2005 and 2008. This was Bob's 65th title of his career and the 67th title of Mike's career.

Women's doubles

 Vania King /  Yaroslava Shvedova def.  Liezel Huber /  Nadia Petrova, 2–6, 6–4, 7–6(7–4)
 This was the pair of King and Shvedova second women's grand slam doubles title of the year and of their careers to go along with the 2010 Wimbledon crown. This was King's eleventh women's doubles title of her career and Shvedova's third career women's doubles victory.

Mixed doubles 

 Liezel Huber /  Bob Bryan def.  Květa Peschke /  Aisam-ul-Haq Qureshi, 6–4, 6–4.
 This victory was the second joint title in a grand slam tournament for the pair of Huber and Bryan, which they won the 2009 French Open together. This was Huber's second mixed double slam, which all were won with Bob, but this was Bob Bryan seventh mixed doubles title for his career. This was the first US Open title for Huber in mixed doubles, but this was Bob's fourth mixed doubles title for his career to go along with titles in 2003, 2004, and 2006.

Boys' singles

 Jack Sock def.  Denis Kudla, 3–6, 6–2, 6–2

Girls' singles

 Daria Gavrilova def.  Yulia Putintseva, 6–3, 6–2

Boys' doubles

 Duilio Beretta /  Roberto Quiroz def.  Oliver Golding /  Jiří Veselý, 6–1, 7–5
 It was their second Grand Slam Boys' Doubles title in the year after winning at the French Open.

Girls' doubles

 Tímea Babos /  Sloane Stephens def.  An-Sophie Mestach /  Silvia Njirić, walkover
 It was their third Grand Slam Girls' Doubles title in the year after winning at the French Open and at the Wimbledon Championships.

Wheelchair men's singles 

 Shingo Kunieda def.  Nicolas Peifer, walkover

Wheelchair women's singles 

 Esther Vergeer def.  Daniela Di Toro, 6–0, 6–0

Wheelchair men's doubles 

 Maikel Scheffers /  Ronald Vink def.  Nicolas Peifer /  Jon Rydberg, 6–0, 6–0

Wheelchair women's doubles 

 Esther Vergeer /  Sharon Walraven def.  Daniela Di Toro /  Aniek van Koot, 6–3, 6–3

Wheelchair quad singles 

 David Wagner def.  Peter Norfolk, 6–0, 2–6, 6–3

Wheelchair quad doubles 

 Nick Taylor /  David Wagner def.  Johan Andersson /  Peter Norfolk, 7–5, 7–6(7–4)

Champions invitational 
The Champions Invitational returned for the fifth year with 16 former Grand Slam tournament champions and finalists. It was a doubles only event for the first time, but employed the fan-friendly World TeamTennis format for the second consecutive year. Players were divided into four teams of four players each that were named after members of the US Open Court of Champions. All teams played two matches from Wednesday, September 8, through Saturday, September 11. For the first time, prize money was awarded to the competitors based on their team's order of finish.

The invitees for this year's event included a host of past US Open champions, including sixteen-time US Open champion Martina Navratilova, two-time women's singles champion Tracy Austin (1979, 1981) and 1988 men's singles champion Mats Wilander, as well as the Champion Invitational's first "Hall of Fame team": 2010 International Tennis Hall of Fame inductees Gigi Fernández and Natasha Zvereva, who teamed to win three US Open women's doubles titles, and Todd Woodbridge and Mark Woodforde, collectively known as The Woodies, who won back-to-back men's doubles championships in 1995 and 1996.

Also scheduled to compete were U.S. Fed Cup Captain and two-time Grand Slam singles finalist Mary Joe Fernández, 1989 French Open champion Michael Chang, 1987 Wimbledon champion Pat Cash, 1997 French Open champion Iva Majoli, 1996 Wimbledon runner-up MaliVai Washington and 1999 US Open finalist Todd Martin.

Teams 

Team Connolly
 Gigi Fernández
 Todd Woodbridge
 Mark Woodforde
 Natasha Zvereva

Team Gibson
 MaliVai Washington
 Mary Joe Fernández
 Todd Martin
 Tracy Austin

Team Kramer
 Pat Cash
 Martina Navratilova
 Chanda Rubin
 Michael Chang

Team Tilden
 Iva Majoli
 Conchita Martínez
 Cédric Pioline
 Mats Wilander

Results

Singles seeds 
The following are the seeded players and notable players who withdrew from the event. Seedings based on ATP and WTA rankings as of August 23, 2010. Rankings and points were before as of August 30, 2010.

Men's singles 

The following players would have been seeded, but they withdrew from the event.

Women's singles 

The following players would have been seeded, but they withdrew from the event.

Wildcard entries 
Below are the lists of the wildcard awardees entering in the main draws and in the qualifying draws.

Men's singles
  Carsten Ball
  James Blake
  Bradley Klahn
  Guillaume Rufin
  Tim Smyczek
  Jack Sock
  Ryan Sweeting
  Donald Young

Women's singles
  Beatrice Capra
  Sophie Ferguson
  Chelsey Gullickson
  Jamie Hampton
  Christina McHale
  Virginie Razzano
  Shelby Rogers
  CoCo Vandeweghe

Men's doubles
  Bradley Klahn /  Tim Smyczek
  David Martin /  Donald Young
  Ryan Harrison /  Robert Kendrick
  Robby Ginepri /  Ryan Sweeting
  Drew Courtney /  Michael Shabaz
  Brian Battistone /  Ryler DeHeart
  Sekou Bangoura /  Nathan Pasha

Women's doubles
  Alexa Glatch /  CoCo Vandeweghe
  Hilary Barte /  Lindsay Burdette
  Lauren Herring /  Grace Min
  Christina McHale /  Riza Zalameda
  Carly Gullickson /  Chelsey Gullickson
  Jamie Hampton /  Melanie Oudin
  Jill Craybas /  Sloane Stephens

Mixed doubles 
  Beatrice Capra /  Jack Sock
  Jill Craybas /  Michael Russell
  Nicole Gibbs /  Sam Querrey
  Carly Gullickson /  Travis Parrott
  Racquel Kops-Jones /  Eric Butorac
  Melanie Oudin /  Ryan Harrison
  Abigail Spears /  Scott Lipsky

Protected ranking 
The following players were accepted directly into the main draw using a protected ranking:

Men's Singles
  Máximo González
  David Nalbandian
  Dmitry Tursunov
  Kristof Vliegen

Women's Singles
  Anne Keothavong
  Jelena Kostanić Tošić
  Urszula Radwańska

Qualifier entries 
Below are the lists of the qualifiers entering the main draw.

Men's singles 

  Ivan Dodig
  Lukáš Rosol
  Peter Polansky
  Dušan Lojda
  Andreas Haider-Maurer
  Júlio Silva
  Martin Kližan
  Milos Raonic
  Ričardas Berankis
  Ryan Harrison
  Robert Kendrick
  Kei Nishikori
  Adrian Mannarino
  Rik de Voest
  Benoît Paire
  Marc Gicquel

Women's singles 

  Akgul Amanmuradova
  Nuria Llagostera Vives
  Monica Niculescu
  Mirjana Lučić
  Sally Peers
  Tamira Paszek
  Mandy Minella
  Lourdes Domínguez Lino
  Rebecca Marino
  Irina Falconi
  Maria Elena Camerin
  Zuzana Kučová
  Zuzana Ondrášková
  Olga Savchuk
  Sania Mirza
  Michelle Larcher de Brito

Withdrawals 
The following players were accepted directly into the main tournament, but withdrew with injuries or personal reasons.

Men's singles
  Mario Ančić → replaced by  Tobias Kamke
  Juan Martín del Potro → replaced by  Somdev Devvarman
  Tommy Haas → replaced by  Dudi Sela
  Ivo Karlović → replaced by  Dustin Brown
  Jo-Wilfried Tsonga → replaced by  Carlos Berlocq

Women's singles
  Melinda Czink → replaced by  Anna Chakvetadze
  Justine Henin → replaced by  Sandra Záhlavová
  Serena Williams → replaced by  Gréta Arn

Point distribution

Prize money 
All prize money is in US dollars ($); doubles prize money is distributed per pair.

Men's and women's singles 
 Winners: $1,700,000
 Runners-up: $850,000
 Semi-finalists: $400,000
 Quarter-finalists: $200,000
 Fourth round: $100,000
 Third round: $50,250
 Second round: $31,000
 First round: $19,000

Men's and women's doubles 
 Winners: $420,000
 Runners-up: $210,000
 Semi-finalists: $105,000
 Quarter-finalists: $50,000
 Third round: $25,000
 Second round: $15,000
 First round: $10,000

Mixed doubles 
 Winners: $150,000
 Runners-up: $70,000
 Semi-finalists: $30,000
 Quarter-finalists: $15,000
 Second round: $10,000
 First round: $5,000

Media coverage

References

External links 

 Official website of US Open

 
2010
2010 in tennis
2010 in American tennis
2010 in sports in New York City
August 2010 sports events in the United States
September 2010 sports events in the United States